John L. Freeman (born September 10, 1954) is an American politician and former Wyoming state legislator. A member of the Democratic Party, Freeman represented the 60th district in the Wyoming House of Representatives from 2011 to 2021.

Early life and education

John L. Freeman was born on September 10, 1954. In 1972, he graduated from Rock Springs High School. In 1975, he graduated from Western Wyoming Community College with an associates of arts degree and graduated from University of Wyoming with a Bachelor of Arts in history in 1978. He married Theresa Collins, with whom he had three children.

Wyoming House of Representatives

In 2010, Freeman won the Democratic nomination for a seat in the Wyoming House of Representatives from the 60th district without opposition and defeated Republican nominee Ted York in the general election to succeed Bill Thompson. He won reelection in 2012, 2014, 2016, and 2018. Freeman announced that he would not seek reelection in 2020.

In 2010, Freeman was selected to serve on the education committee in the Wyoming House of Representatives. Freeman has served as chairman of the Wyoming House of Representatives Minority Caucus since 2017. During the 2020 presidential election Freeman endorsed Joe Biden for the Democratic presidential nomination.

Electoral history

References

External links
Official page at the Wyoming Legislature
 

1954 births
21st-century American politicians
Living people
Democratic Party members of the Wyoming House of Representatives
People from Washakie County, Wyoming
Place of birth missing (living people)
Schoolteachers from Wyoming
University of Wyoming alumni